"A World of Difference" is episode 23 of the American television anthology series The Twilight Zone.

Opening narration

Plot
Arthur Curtis is a successful businessman planning a vacation to San Francisco with his loving wife Marian. After arriving at his office and talking with his secretary Sally, he finds that his telephone is not functional and, hearing someone yell "cut", he discovers his office is a movie set on a sound stage. He is told that Arthur Curtis is merely a character he is playing, and that his real identity is Gerald Raigan, a movie star who is caught in the middle of a brutal divorce from hostile Nora, his own alcoholism and a declining career. Apparently his mental health has been deteriorating for some time and the studio is fed up with him, thinking that he is simply faking mental illness to avoid his responsibilities. The director warns Raigan/Curtis that he will likely be fired if he leaves but, disoriented, he ignores this information and departs the studio to go home. Outside, he is nearly hit by a car driven by Nora, who helps him up and begins demanding the money awarded her from their divorce settlement, though Raigan/Curtis insists he doesn't know who Nora is. They leave together in the car.

He tries in vain to locate Arthur Curtis's house, and mistakes a little girl for his daughter, causing her to flee in terror. Nora drives him to their actual home. Inside, he meets his (Raigan's) agent, who tells him that if he fails to continue work that day, he will drop him as a client. Curtis still protests that he is not Raigan, and tries to call his workplace, but the operator cannot find any listing of it. His agent believes that he is having a nervous breakdown, and shows him the shooting script of a movie called The Private World of Arthur Curtis. He then tells him that the movie is being canceled due to his current outburst and his ongoing issues.

Raigan/Curtis rushes back to the set, which is being dismantled, and pleads not to be left in the uncaring world of Gerald Raigan. His office reappears as it was before, just as Marian arrives. Sally gives him his plane tickets. As Raigan/Curtis hears echoes of the workers dismantling the studio, he embraces Marian and desperately tells her that he never wants to lose her, and that they should leave for their vacation immediately. They then quickly exit his office and head to the airport. Meanwhile, in the other world, Raigan’s agent shows up on the set to find that Raigan has vanished. Some of the crew saw him return to the set but no one saw him leave. Perplexed, the agent wonders where Raigan might have gone. As the set is taken apart, the "Arthur Curtis" script lies amidst a cluttered desk, waiting to be thrown away. An airplane is seen, having just taken off and vanishing into thin air, hinting that Curtis/Raigan escaped into the world he wanted.

Closing narration

Further reading
DeVoe, Bill. (2008). Trivia from The Twilight Zone. Albany, GA: Bear Manor Media. 
Grams, Martin. (2008). The Twilight Zone: Unlocking the Door to a Television Classic. Churchville, MD: OTR Publishing.

External links
 
 the-croc.com episode page (unlike TV.com, lists Frank Maxwell playing Marty)

The Twilight Zone (1959 TV series season 1) episodes
1960 American television episodes
Television episodes written by Richard Matheson
Television episodes about parallel universes
Television episodes directed by Ted Post